Thomas Foley, 3rd Baron Foley PC, DL  (22 December 1780 – 16 April 1833), was a British peer and Whig politician. He served as Captain of the Honourable Corps of Gentlemen Pensioners under Lord Grey between 1830 and 1833.

Background
Foley was the son of Thomas Foley, 2nd Baron Foley, and Henrietta Stanhope.

Political career
Foley succeeded as third Baron Foley on the death of his father in 1793 and was able to take his seat in the House of Lords on his 21st birthday in 1801. When the Whigs came to power under Lord Grey in 1830, Foley was appointed Captain of the Honourable Corps of Gentlemen Pensioners, a post he held until his early death in 1833. In 1830 he was admitted to the Privy Council. Apart from his political career he was also Lord Lieutenant of Worcestershire between 1831 and 1833 and Master of the Quorn Hunt from 1805 to 1806.

Family
Lord Foley married Lady Cecilia Olivia Geraldine FitzGerald (3 March 1786 – London, 27 July 1863), daughter of William FitzGerald, 2nd Duke of Leinster, in Boyle Farm, Kingston upon Thames, on 18 August 1806. They had four sons, and four daughters:

Thomas Henry Foley, 4th Baron Foley of Kidderminster (11 Dec 1808 - 20 Nov 1869)
Colonel Augustus Frederick (9 Dec 1810 - 9 Oct 1881) was an officer in the Grenadier Guards. Died unmarried.
Gen. Sir St. George Gerald (10 July 1814 - 24 Jan 1897) married Augusta Selina Sturt, daughter of Henry Sturt.
Adm. FitzGerald Algernon Charles (5 Sep 1823 - 26 July 1903) was married twice. Firstly to Frances Campbell, daughter of Sir George Campbell and Margaret Christie, on 27 August 1850. Several years after her death he married secondly, Renira Anna Purvis, daughter of the Rev. Richard Purvis, on 21 July 1874. With Frances he had four sons, and three daughters.
Geraldine Augusta (d. 23 March 1887) married Phillippe Ferdinand Augustus de Rohan-Chabot, Vicomte de Chabot. They had no children.
Georgina Louisa (d. 21 Nov 1864) married Thomas Molyneux-Montgomerie on 27 February 1844. They had no children.
Adelaide Georgiana Frederica (d. 19 Jan 1861) married Gen. Thomas Ashburnham on 8 February 1860. They had no children.

He died in London in April 1833, aged 52, he was succeeded in the barony by his son, Thomas, who also succeeded him as chief whip in the Whig government. Lady Foley died in 1863.

Notes

References

1780 births
1833 deaths
Thomas
Honourable Corps of Gentlemen at Arms
Lord-Lieutenants of Worcestershire
Masters of foxhounds in England
Members of the Privy Council of the United Kingdom
Owners of Epsom Derby winners
Whig (British political party) politicians
3